NGC 312 is an elliptical galaxy in the constellation Phoenix. It was discovered on September 5, 1836 by John Herschel.

References

0312
18360905
Phoenix (constellation)
Elliptical galaxies
003343